Rob Oakley (born 8 November 1999) is a Scotland international rugby league footballer who most recently played as a  or  for the London Broncos in the Betfred Championship.

He has spent time on loan from the Broncos at the London Skolars in League 1.

Background
Oakley was born in Colchester, Essex, England. He is of Scottish heritage.

He played for the Eastern Rhinos as a junior. He played for the London Origin side.
 
Oakley was educated at Colne College and Sigma Sixth.

Playing career

Club career
Oakley progressed through the London Broncos academy and reserves sides. He was promoted to the first team squad ahead of the 2021 season.

He made his professional debut for the London Broncos in June 2021 against Whitehaven.

Oakley spent time on loan from the Broncos at the Skolars in League 1 in both 2021 and 2022.

He signed a new contract with the Broncos at the end of the 2021 season.

International career
Oakley was called up to the Scotland squad for the first time in October 2021. He made his international debut for the Bravehearts against Jamaica.

He was not selected in the final Scotland squad for the 2021 Rugby League World Cup.

References

External links
London Broncos profile

1999 births
Living people
English people of Scottish descent
English rugby league players
London Broncos players
London Skolars players
Rugby league players from Essex
Rugby league locks
Rugby league hookers
Scotland national rugby league team players